Peter Robinson may refer to:

Entertainment
 Peter Robinson (sideshow artist) (1873–1947), American actor and sideshow performer, known for his appearance in film Freaks (1932)
 J. Peter Robinson (born 1945), British musician and film score composer
 Peter Robinson (conductor) (born 1949), British conductor
 Peter Robinson (novelist) (1950–2022), British-born Canadian crime writer.
 Peter Charles Robinson or Pete McCarthy (1951–2004), British comedian
 Peter Robinson (poet) (born 1953), British poet and professor
 Peter Robinson (New Zealand musician) (1958–2016), New Zealand musician
 Peter Robinson (artist) (born 1966), New Zealand artist of Maori descent
 Peter Robinson (Australian musician), founder of Australian band The Strangers
 Peter Manning Robinson, film score composer, see The Maddening
 Peter Robinson or Marilyn (singer) (born 1962), British pop singer

Politics
 Peter Robinson (Canadian politician) (1785–1838)
 Peter Robinson (speaker) (1791–1841), American politician in New York state
 Peter Robinson (Northern Ireland politician) (born 1948), Northern Irish politician
 Pete Robinson (Georgia state politician), in 138th to 140th Georgia General Assembly (1985–90)

Sports
 Peter Robinson (Australian footballer) (born 1953), Australian rules footballer
Peter Robinson (cricketer, born 1929), English cricketer
 Peter Robinson (cricketer, born 1943), English cricketer
Pete Robinson (drag racer) (1933–1971), American drag racer
 Peter Robinson (footballer, born 1922) (1922–2000), English footballer
 Peter Robinson (footballer, born 1957), English footballer
 Peter Robinson (rugby league) (born 1976), Australian rugby league footballer and commentator

Other professions
 Peter D. Robinson (born 1969), English bishop
Peter Frederick Robinson (1776–1858), British architect
Peter Robinson (chancellor), Canadian academic, see List of Canadian university leaders
 Peter Robinson (computer scientist) (born 1952), English academic and computer scientist
Peter Robinson (journalist) (born 1977), British music journalist
Peter Robinson (lawyer) (born 1953), American lawyer
 Peter Robinson (priest) (born 1961), Archdeacon of Lindisfarne
Peter Robinson (speechwriter) (born 1957), American speechwriter and interviewer
 Peter Robinson (1804–1874), British founder of the Peter Robinson department store chain

Other uses
 Peter Robinson (department store)